Commandant Jean Baptiste Marie Charles de Tricornot de Rose (14 October 1876 – 11 May 1916) was a French Army pilot.  He joined the French Army in 1895 and became a cavalry officer.  During a three-year suspension, for refusing orders to enter churches in support of the 1905 French law on the Separation of the Churches and the State, de Rose became interested in aircraft.  Upon his return to the army he attended a flying school and became the first holder of a French military pilot's licence.  In the lead-up to the First World War de Rose served under Jean Baptiste Eugène Estienne to develop French army aviation and experimented with mounting machine guns on aircraft.

During the war de Rose first led a squadron and then the aircraft assigned to the 5th Army.  He foresaw the importance of dedicated fighter aircraft and raised the first French fighter squadron in 1915.  De Rose played a key part in the early stage of the 1916 Battle of Verdun, using groups of aircraft and continuous patrolling to establish air superiority over the German forces.  He died during a demonstration of flying near Soissons.

Early life and career 
De Rose was born in Paris on 14 October 1876, the son of Jean-Baptiste Charles Emmanuel de Tricornot de Rose and Jeanne Marie Jacobé de Naurois.  De Rose joined the French Army as an officer cadet at Versailles on 31 August 1895 and attended the École spéciale militaire de Saint-Cyr.  He was appointed a second lieutenant in the 9th Dragoon Regiment on 1 August 1897.  He was promoted to lieutenant on 1 August 1899.

In early 1906 de Rose's unit was ordered to secure some French villages during a period of political conflict between the government and the Roman Catholic church as a result of the 1905 French law on the Separation of the Churches and the State which brought all churches into public ownership.  A staunch Catholic, de Rose refused an order to enter churches to take an inventory.  In a subsequent court martial he was sentenced to three years' suspension from the army, beginning on 20 April 1906.  De Rose spent his suspension learning about aircraft and mechanics.  He was married to Madeleine Tavernier on 10 November 1906; the couple lived at Fontainebleau.  One of their sons was François de Rose, French ambassador to Portugal 1964–70.

De Rose returned from suspension on 29 March 1909 and was assigned to the 19th Dragoon Regiment.  He was detached from his unit in 1910 to attend a flying school at Pau airfield.  De Rose received his civilian flying licence in late 1910 and, on 7 February 1911, was awarded the first French military pilot's licence.  He afterwards worked under Colonel (later General) Jean Baptiste Eugène Estienne, an artillery officer who pioneered French military aviation as a spotting aid for his guns, at the headquarters in Vincennes.  De Rose transferred to the 1st Engineer Regiment on 21 August 1911, in connection with his work in military aviation.  He was appointed a Chevalier of the Légion d'honneur on 14 October 1911.  During this period de Rose experimented with mounting machine guns onto the army's aircraft.

First World War 

Shortly after the outbreak of the First World War in August 1914 de Rose was appointed to command the French Army's 12th aircraft squadron.  In November he was appointed commander of aviation with the 5th Army.  De Rose was one of the first to recognise the role dedicated fighter aircraft would play in war; they had hitherto been used mainly for reconnaissance. He organised France's first fighter squadron (the 12th Squadron), dedicated to attacking opposing aircraft, in spring 1915, though some of his comrades doubted it would prove useful.  

De Rose's fighter squadron was equipped with six two-seater Morane-Saulnier aircraft, which was then the fastest and most manoeuvrable in French service. Nine of his twelve pilots and gunner/observers were drawn from the cavalry. The unit's first kill was made on 1 April 1915 and by the end of the summer they had accounted for four German aircraft. Performance improved after the introduction of machine gun–equipped single-seater aircraft. De Rose was appointed an Officer of the Legion d'honneur on 13 July 1915.

Verdun 
During the start of the Battle of Verdun French commander Philippe Pétain found himself suffering due to losses of reconnaissance aircraft.  He summoned de Rose and granted him authority to do what was necessary to secure the skies, telling him "de Rose, sweep the sky for me! I am blind!... If we are chased out of the sky, then, it is simple, Verdun will be lost".

De Rose was granted half of the French Army's fighter squadrons, equipped with the latest Nieuport biplanes, to form the first independent air unit in the French Army, the Groupement de combat (Combat Group).  De Rose ordered his men not to act alone or to seek one-on-one duels with German pilots, instead they were to operate in groups.  He instigated training in group flying tactics and flight discipline.  Initially the pilots operated in groups of three but eventually this was expanded to groups of six and nine.  De Rose was keen to ensure a continuous presence in the air to deter German aircraft and instigated a series of patrols, rotating with fresh crews every three hours.  His pilots were permitted to range far into German-occupied territory to extend air superiority.  This led to complaints from the ground troops that they felt vulnerable to aerial attack as they could not see French planes and de Rose was forced to schedule additional patrols over friendly lines.  De Rose quickly established air superiority; his squadrons were withdrawn by the end of March to support other sectors, and he was posted away.  German aircraft soon made a reappearance but measures taken by de Rose's successor, Captain Le Révérend, restored French air superiority by May.

Death 

De Rose died on 11 May 1916 when, during a demonstration flight near Soissons, he cut his engine to perform a turn but found he was unable to restart it and crashed.  He has been described as "the father of French fighter aircraft" by French historian Pierre Razoux.

References 

1876 births
1916 deaths
French Army officers
French World War I pilots
Aviators from Paris
Aviators killed in aviation accidents or incidents in France
Officiers of the Légion d'honneur